Anne Zahalka (born 1957) is an Australian photo media artist (photographer). Her work is held in the collections of the Art Gallery of New South Wales, National Gallery of Victoria and  the National Gallery of Australia. In 2005, she was the recipient of the Leopold Godowsky Award at the Photographic Resource Centre in Boston.

Early life
She was born to a Jewish Austrian mother and Catholic Czech father. Her parents met and married in England during the Second World War. Zahalka subsequently developed an interest in Australia's migrants and diverse cultures.

Education 
She studied at Sydney College of the Arts (undergraduate and postgraduate), 1979.

Career 
Zahalka's artwork revolves around Australian culture, focusing on themes such as gender roles, leisure activities and the conventions of art. 

Speaking in interviews, she has spoken of her family and how her upbringing has influenced her work.  She reflects on the lack of migrants' written documents, images and texts about Australia.

Her best known image is "The Sunbather #2". Another major art commission "Welcome to Sydney" was completed in 2003 for Sydney Airport.

She has featured in many solo and group exhibitions between 1980 and the present, as well as the artwork, Welcome to Sydney commissioned by Sydney Airport in 2002. Her solo exhibition, Hall of Mirrors, at the Centre for Contemporary Photography was the first mid-career retrospective held at the gallery of an Australian photographer. Additionally, Zahalka has curated many group exhibitions.

Exhibitions 
Haimish, The Jewish Museum, Melbourne, 1998
Leisureland, Roslyn Oxley9 Gallery, Sydney, 2000
Fortresses and Frontiers, Robert Sandelson Gallery, London, 2000
Hall of Mirrors: Anne Zahalka Portraits 1987–2007, Centre for Contemporary Photography, 2007/08. A mid-career retrospective.
Wild Life, ARC ONE Gallery, Melbourne, 2008
A Time and a Place, group exhibition, Griffith University Arts Gallery, South East Queensland, 2015
Wild Life, Australia, ARC ONE Gallery, Melbourne, 2019

Residencies 
 Resemblance, 1987 Künstlerhaus Bethanien, Berlin during 1986/87.
 Gertrude Street International Studio, 3-month residency, Melbourne Bondi Pavilion, Bondi, 6-month residency, 1989
 Sofitel, Melbourne, Victoria Bundanon, Arthur Boyd Estate, New South Wales, 2008
 Bondi the Beautiful residency, Bondi Pavilion Gallery, 2011
 HMAS Penguin residency commemorating the centenary of the Royal Australian Navy Newington College, Concordia through the Newington Women's Fund, 2013
 Turner Gallery Perth, Western Australia, 2017

Awards
2005: Leopold Godowsky Award, Photographic Resource Centre, Boston.

Collections
Zahalka's work is held in the following permanent collections:
Art Gallery of New South Wales, Sydney
Monash Gallery of Art, Monash, Melbourne, Victoria
National Gallery of Victoria.
Tweed River Art Gallery, New South Wales: "The Bathers"
National Gallery of Australia, Canberra, ACT : " Die Putzfrau (The Cleaner) 1987

References

External links

Living people
1957 births
Artists from Sydney
20th-century Australian photographers
Australian women photographers
University of Sydney alumni
20th-century Australian women artists
21st-century Australian photographers
21st-century Australian women artists